"Big Casino" is a song by American rock band Jimmy Eat World from their sixth studio album Chase This Light, which was released on October 16, 2007. The single was released on August 28, 2007. The song impacted radio on September 11, 2007.

History
The song title is taken from the name of a side project of Jimmy Eat World singer Jim Adkins, titled Go Big Casino.

The song premiered on Jimmy Eat World's official website, and the album Chase This Light's official new website. Some time after, it was added to a revamped Jimmy Eat World MySpace. On October 16, 2007 the song was physically released as a single.

Critical reception
Slant Magazine's Jonathan Keefe said it wasn't as powerful as "The Middle", but gave it praise for having "a memorable guitar riff and [exploding] into a massive chorus." Brian Hiatt of Rolling Stone was critical of the song's use of synths but still praised it as "an exhilarating seize-what’s-left-of-the-day anthem." Despite giving a negative review of the album and criticizing the track's lyrical missteps, Andrew Blackie from PopMatters called it "a decent rocker with one of the best examples of a soaring ‘emo’ chorus of the year."

Music video
 The Big Casino video was shot at the Las Vegas Neon Museum Boneyard in a single day (with a return for pickups at night), featuring the band playing among the yard's old billboards and casino neon signs. While the band plays during parts of the verses Jim Adkins is seen walking around parts of the yard dragging his guitar with him. As the video progresses it switches between night and day, with many of the billboards and signs being lit up, with the moon also in view.

The video premiered on Yahoo October 22, 2007  followed by being added to Jimmy Eat World's official website on October 23, 2007, and moments later was added to Jimmy Eat World's YouTube and Universal Music's YouTube.

Charts

Track list
UK 7"/CD
 Big Casino – 3:40
 Beautiful Is – 2:30

UK 7"
 Big Casino – 3:40
 Open Bar Reception – 3:54

Matt Fishel cover
In 2014, "Big Casino" was recorded by British singer Matt Fishel for his EP of cover versions, titled Cover Boy. Fishel's version of the song, produced by Fishel and Mark Crew, is more acoustic and stripped back than Jimmy Eat World's original. It is at a slower tempo and incorporates piano, acoustic and electric guitars, drums and strings, along with Fishel's layered vocals and multiple harmonies. According to Howard Stump of music blog Soundtrack To My Day, Fishel "really brings the melody to life in his version", which appears as the fourth track on Fishel's Cover Boy EP, released internationally by Young Lust Records on July 14, 2014.

References

External links
Big Casino Lyrics

2007 singles
Jimmy Eat World songs
Song recordings produced by Butch Vig
2007 songs
Interscope Records singles